Keep Calm and Be a Superstar is a 2018 Chinese action comedy film co-written and directed by Vincent Kok and starring Eason Chan, Li Ronghao and Li Yitong. The film premiered in China on January 12, 2018.

Cast
 Eason Chan as Yuan Bao
 Li Ronghao as Tie Zhu
 Li Yitong as Tong Tong
 Danny Chan Kwok-kwan as Brother Tai
 Cui Zhiwei
 Hui Shiu-hung as Wang Qifa
 Wilfred Lau
 K. C. Collins
 Zheng Yifeng
 Edward Ma

Production
Production started in June 2017 and ended in October 2017.

Release
The film was released on January 12, 2018 in China. Douban gave the film 3.6 out of 10. The film received mainly negative reviews.

References

External links
 
 

2018 films
Chinese action comedy films
2018 action comedy films
Films set in Thailand
2010s Mandarin-language films